The Yokai King is an action fantasy Japanese feature film starring Shin Koyamada. The film is based on the supernatural beings called yōkai from Japanese folklore. It was mainly filmed in English in various locations of Okinawa, Japan.

Plot
Yokai are a class of supernatural creatures that have long held a prominent place in Japanese folklore. They come in a variety of forms, from hideous demons to mischievous creatures to heroes with supernatural powers. They are sometimes dangerous to humans since yokai are not restrained by the laws of nature and those who are not already part animal have the ability to shapeshift.

The legend goes that Ippei (Shin Koyamada) was found by his foster father in a coconut shell on a beach. Although he was brought up as a normal boy, Ippei could see nature’s spirits, including kijimuna, invisible to human eyes. As with many legendary heroes, Ippei was initially unaware of his supernatural talents and therefore his destiny.

Cast
Shin Koyamada as Ippei
Lisa Nakama as Kana
Saki as Osaki
Kirk Dixon as Nyarl
TJ Kayama as Shuten-dōji
Nicholas Rush as Shachi
Kiki Sukezane as Nuko
Vanessa Pan as Gyuki
Kingoro Torajima as Tengu
Daisuke Onaga as Takeshi
Kyoko Fukushi as Hahti
Chesuka Hentona as Young Ippei
Kougi Inoue as Awati

Production
On November 11, 2013, Okinawa Entertainment Studio announced the production of the series at the media room of the Okinawa Prefecture Government in Naha, Okinawa Japan. The majority of the series filmed in various cities in Okinawa, Japan. It was shot on Red Epic.

References

External links
 

2010s American television miniseries
Okinawa Prefecture
Television shows set in Japan
Works about yōkai
Yōkai in popular culture